(died 1996) was a Japanese stunt man and actor best known for playing Godzilla in Terror of Mechagodzilla and in episodes of Zone Fighter, a tokusatsu show. He is the only known actor to have played both Godzilla and Gamera.

Partial filmography
 Ultraman Ace
 Zone Fighter as Godzilla
 Ultraman Taro
 Ultraman Leo
 Terror of Mechagodzilla as Godzilla
 The Last Dinosaur as Tyrannosaurus
 Gamera: Super Monster as Gamera

References
 https://www.imdb.com/name/nm0442778/
 https://www.amazon.com/Meatball-Machine/dp/B002ZS0RBW/

Japanese male film actors
1996 deaths
Year of birth missing
Place of birth missing